G35, G-35 or G.35 may refer to:

 Infiniti G35, an automobile
 G35 (chipset), a motherboard chipset manufactured by Intel
 Glock 35, a firearm
 Gudbrandsdalsost, a type of brown cheese popular in Norway
 G35 Jinan–Guangzhou Expressway in China